Bhamini is a village and Mandal in Parvathipuram Manyam district , Andhra Pradesh. It is located in Palakonda Revenue Division. The River Vamsadhara flows through border of Bhamini mandal and Orissa.

Demographics 
According to Indian census, 2001, the demographic details of this mandal is as follows:
 Total Population: 	41,058	in 9,456 Households.
 Male Population: 	20,265	and Female Population: 	20,793
 Children Under 6-years of age: 	6,178	(Boys – 3,109	and Girls - 	3,069)
 Total Literates: 	16,024

References 

Villages in Parvathipuram Manyam district